The 1904 Isle of Thanet by-election was held in the UK Parliament constituency of the Isle of Thanet on 7 October 1904, following the death of Conservative Party MP James Lowther. It was successfully defended for the Conservative party by Harry Marks.

Vacancy
Conservative Party MP James Lowther Lowther died on 12 September 1904, triggering a by-election to fill the vacancy.

Electoral history
The Isle of Thanet seat had been held by the Conservative party since its creation in 1885. In the 1900 general election Conservative candidate James Lowther was elected unopposed.

Candidates
In anticipation of a forthcoming general election, the local Liberal association, about 6 months earlier, had selected 44 year old Joseph King as their candidate. He lived in Surrey, where he had previously been elected to the county council.

Campaign
The usually Conservative supporting newspaper The Times, took a position in opposition to the Conservative candidate.

Result

Aftermath
Marks held the seat at the subsequent general election.

Marks would go on to represent the constituency until retiring in 1910.

References

1904 elections in the United Kingdom
1904 in England
By-elections to the Parliament of the United Kingdom in Kent constituencies
October 1904 events